Başaran is a small town in the District of Kuyucak, Aydın Province, Turkey. As of 2010, it had a population of 1477 people.

References

Villages in Kuyucak District